16-bit computing is computing with 16-bit addresses or units of data.

16-bit or variants may also refer to:

16-bit era of video game consoles
16bit (band), a British electronic music and production duo 
16 Bit (Italian band), an Italian rock band
Snap!, a German Eurodance group that were originally named 16 Bit